Grotella grisescens is a moth in the genus Grotella, of the family Noctuidae. The species was first described by William Barnes and James Halliday McDunnough in 1910. This moth species is found in North America, including New Mexico (its type location)  and Arizona.

References

External links
Moths of South-Eastern Arizona 

Grotella
Taxa named by William Barnes (entomologist)
Taxa named by James Halliday McDunnough
Moths described in 1910